In mathematics, the transitive closure of a binary relation  on a set  is the smallest relation on  that contains  and is transitive.

Informally, the transitive closure gives you the set of all places you can get to from any starting place.

If the binary relation itself is transitive, then the transitive closure is that same binary relation; otherwise, the transitive closure is a different relation.

Conversely, transitive reduction adduces a minimal relation  from a given relation  such that they have the same closure, that is, ; however, many different  with this property may exist.

Both transitive closure and transitive reduction are also used in the closely related area of graph theory.

Transitive relations and examples 

A relation R on a set X is transitive if, for all x, y, z in X, whenever  and  then . Examples of transitive relations include the equality relation on any set, the "less than or equal" relation on any linearly ordered set, and the relation "x was born before y" on the set of all people. Symbolically, this can be denoted as: if  and  then .

One example of a non-transitive relation is "city x can be reached via a direct flight from city y" on the set of all cities. Simply because there is a direct flight from one city to a second city, and a direct flight from the second city to the third, does not imply there is a direct flight from the first city to the third. The transitive closure of this relation is a different relation, namely "there is a sequence of direct flights that begins at city x and ends at city y". Every relation can be extended in a similar way to a transitive relation.

An example of a non-transitive relation with a less meaningful transitive closure is "x is the day of the week after y". The transitive closure of this relation is "some day x comes after a day y on the calendar", which is trivially true for all days of the week x and y (and thus equivalent to the Cartesian square, which is "x and y are both days of the week").

Existence and description 
For any relation R, the transitive closure of R always exists. To see this, note that the intersection of any family of transitive relations is again transitive. Furthermore, there exists at least one transitive relation containing R, namely the trivial one: X × X. The transitive closure of R is then given by the intersection of all transitive relations containing R.

For finite sets, we can construct the transitive closure step by step, starting from R and adding transitive edges.
This gives the intuition for a general construction. For any set X, we
can prove that transitive closure is given by the following expression

where  is the i-th power of R, defined inductively by

where  denotes composition of relations.

To show that the above definition of R+ is the least transitive relation containing R, we show that it contains R, that it is transitive, and that it is the smallest set with both of those characteristics.

  is minimal, that is, if  is any transitive relation containing , then : Given any such , induction on  can be used to show  for all  as follows: Base:  by assumption. Hence,  by assumption and by induction hypothesis.

Properties 
The intersection of two transitive relations is transitive.

The union of two transitive relations need not be transitive. To preserve transitivity, one must take the transitive closure. This occurs, for example, when taking the union of two equivalence relations or two preorders. To obtain a new equivalence relation or preorder one must take the transitive closure (reflexivity and symmetry—in the case of equivalence relations—are automatic).

In graph theory 

In computer science, the concept of transitive closure can be thought of as constructing a data structure that makes it possible to answer reachability questions. That is, can one get from node a to node d in one or more hops? A binary relation tells you only that node a is connected to node b, and that node b is connected to node c, etc. After the transitive closure is constructed, as depicted in the following figure, in an O(1) operation one may determine that node d is reachable from node a. The data structure is typically stored as a matrix, so if matrix[1][4] = 1, then it is the case that node 1 can reach node 4 through one or more hops.

The transitive closure of the adjacency relation of a directed acyclic graph (DAG) is the reachability relation of the DAG and a strict partial order.

The transitive closure of an undirected graph produces a cluster graph, a disjoint union of cliques. Constructing the transitive closure is an equivalent formulation of the problem of finding the components of the graph.

In logic and computational complexity 
The transitive closure of a binary relation cannot, in general, be expressed in first-order logic (FO).
This means that one cannot write a formula using predicate symbols R and T that will be satisfied in
any model if and only if T is the transitive closure of R.
In finite model theory, first-order logic (FO) extended with a transitive closure operator is usually called transitive closure logic, and abbreviated FO(TC) or just TC. TC is a sub-type of fixpoint logics. The fact that FO(TC) is strictly more expressive than FO was discovered by Ronald Fagin in 1974; the result was then rediscovered by Alfred Aho and Jeffrey Ullman in 1979, who proposed to use fixpoint logic as a database query language. With more recent concepts of finite model theory, proof that FO(TC) is strictly more expressive than FO follows immediately from the fact that FO(TC) is not Gaifman-local.

In computational complexity theory, the complexity class NL corresponds precisely to the set of logical sentences expressible in TC. This is because the transitive closure property has a close relationship with the NL-complete problem STCON for finding directed paths in a graph. Similarly, the class L is first-order logic with the commutative, transitive closure. When transitive closure is added to second-order logic instead, we obtain PSPACE.

In database query languages 

Since the 1980s Oracle Database has implemented a proprietary SQL extension CONNECT BY... START WITH that allows the computation of a transitive closure as part of a declarative query. The SQL 3 (1999) standard added a more general WITH RECURSIVE construct also allowing transitive closures to be computed inside the query processor; as of 2011 the latter is implemented in IBM Db2, Microsoft SQL Server, Oracle, PostgreSQL, and MySQL (v8.0+). SQLite released support for this in 2014.

Datalog also implements transitive closure computations.

MariaDB implements Recursive Common Table Expressions, which can be used to compute transitive closures. This feature was introduced in release 10.2.2 of April 2016.

Algorithms 
However, this approach is not practical since both the constant factors and the memory consumption for sparse graphs are high .

For directed graphs, Purdom's algorithm solves the problem by first computing its condensation DAG and its transitive closure, then lifting it to the original graph.

More recent research has explored efficient ways of computing transitive closure on distributed systems based on the MapReduce paradigm.

See also 
 Ancestral relation
 Deductive closure
 Reflexive closure
 Symmetric closure
 Transitive reduction (a smallest relation having the transitive closure of R as its transitive closure)

References 

 Foto N. Afrati, Vinayak Borkar, Michael Carey, Neoklis Polyzotis, Jeffrey D. Ullman, Map-Reduce Extensions and Recursive Queries, EDBT 2011, March 22–24, 2011, Uppsala, Sweden, 
 
 
 
  
 
 Keller, U., 2004, Some Remarks on the Definability of Transitive Closure in First-order Logic and Datalog (unpublished manuscript)* 
 
  
 
  Appendix C (online only)

External links 
 "Transitive closure and reduction", The Stony Brook Algorithm Repository, Steven Skiena.

Binary relations
Closure operators
Graph algorithms